Mary Lou Ehnot Soffa is an American computer scientist noted for her research on compilers, program optimization, system software and system engineering.

She is also noted for her leadership in broadening participation in computing. She is on the CRA-W Board and was co-chair from 2000 to 2003. With Jan Cuny, she founded the CRA-W Graduate Cohort Program and the CRA-W Associate Professor Program.

Biography

Soffa received a B.S. in Mathematics from University of Pittsburgh with honors magna cum laude and Phi Beta Kappa. She received an M.S. in Mathematics from Ohio State University and a Ph.D in Computer Science from the University of Pittsburgh.

She then joined the Department of Computer Science at the University of Pittsburgh as an assistant professor in 1977. In 1983 she was promoted to associate professor and in 1990 to professor. She served as Dean of Graduate Studies of the College of Arts and Sciences from 1990 to 1995. In 2004 she was named chair of the Department of Computer Science at the University of Virginia, and the Owen R. Cheatham Professor of Sciences. She has directed 32 graduate students to completion, half of whom are women and two are minorities.   She serves on ACM Council as member-at-large and on the ACM Publications Board.

Awards
In 2012 she received the ACM-IEEE-CS Ken Kennedy Award at SC12, the international conference on high-performance computing.

Her other notable awards include:

ACM SIGSOFT Influential Educator Award in 2014
 ACM SIGPLAN Distinguished Service Award (2003)
 ACM Fellow (1999)
 IEEE Fellow (2013) 
 Anita Borg Technical Leadership Award in 2011
 ACM SIGSOFT 2010 Distinguished Service Award, 2010
 Nico Habermann Award, presented by Computing Research Association, June 2006
 Presidential Award for Excellence in Science, Mathematics, and Engineering Mentoring in 2011

References

External links
 University of Virginia: Mary Lou Soffa, Department of Computer Science

American women computer scientists
American computer scientists
University of Virginia faculty
Fellows of the Association for Computing Machinery
Living people
Year of birth missing (living people)
American women academics
University of Pittsburgh faculty